DeLucia, De Lucia or de Lucia  is the surname of the following people:
Dylan DeLucia (born 2000), American baseball player
Fernando De Lucia (1860–1925), Italian opera tenor and singing teacher
Jason DeLucia (born 1969), American mixed martial artist 
Paco de Lucía (1947–2014), Spanish flamenco guitarist and composer
Pepe de Lucía (born 1945), Spanish flamenco singer and songwriter, brother of Paco
Rich DeLucia (born 1964), American baseball player 
Victor De Lucia (born 1996), Italian football player